Mette Gravholt (born 12 December 1984) is a retired Danish handball player who played for Fredericia HK and Danish national team.

Gravholt is openly lesbian. She met Betina Lambæk, with whom she has a son Matteo who was born via ivf in 2017. The couple got married in July 2018.

Soon after her wedding, Gravholt announced her retirement as a professional handball player, and started a new job at a primary school in Kolding, where she works as  a 1st grade teacher.

International honours
World Championship:
Bronze Medalist: 2013  
EHF Cup:
Winner: 2013
Finalist: 2011

Individual awards
Danish League Top Scorer: 2011, 2012
Danish League Best Pivot: 2013, 2014, 2016

References

1984 births
Living people
Danish female handball players
Lesbian sportswomen
Danish LGBT sportspeople
Danish lesbians
LGBT handball players
Viborg HK players
Expatriate handball players
People from Vejle Municipality
Sportspeople from the Region of Southern Denmark